Bruce Peloquin is a former member of the Wisconsin State Assembly and the Wisconsin State Senate.

Biography
Peloquin was born on November 3, 1936 in Chippewa Falls, Wisconsin. He graduated from the University of Wisconsin-Eau Claire and became a member of the Knights of Columbus and the Society of the Holy Name. Peloquin is married with three children.

Career
Peloquin was a member of the Senate from the 23rd District during the 1971, 1973, 1975 and 1977 sessions. He was elected to the Assembly in 1964, 1966 and 1968. Additionally, Peloquin was a member of the Chippewa County, Wisconsin Board from 1964 to 1966. He is a Democrat.

References

Politicians from Chippewa Falls, Wisconsin
Democratic Party Wisconsin state senators
Democratic Party members of the Wisconsin State Assembly
University of Wisconsin–Eau Claire alumni
1936 births
Living people
Catholics from Wisconsin